Simon Watney is a British writer, art historian, and AIDS activist. His 1987 article, "The Spectacle of AIDS", was included in The Gay and Lesbian Studies Reader. He also published Policing Desire: Pornography, AIDS and the Media in 1987. He co-founded OutRage! in 1990, and he and Keith Alcorn and Chris Woods set up its first meeting. He published Imagine Hope: AIDS and the Gay Identity in 2002. His latest book is Twenty Sussex Churches (2007).

References

External links 
Reimagining Hope: An Interview With Simon Watney (August 2013)

HIV/AIDS activists
British art historians
British architectural historians
Living people
British LGBT writers
Year of birth missing (living people)